Henry Augustus Anstiss (22 August 1899 – 9 March 1964) was a much travelled English footballer who played as an inside-forward for Hammersmith Athletic, Brentford, Millwall, Watford, Rochdale, Sheffield Wednesday, Port Vale, Swansea Town, Crewe Alexandra, Gillingham, Tunbridge Wells Rangers and Cray Wanderers in the 1920s and 1930s. His most significant spell was with Port Vale, with whom he won the Third Division North title in 1929–30.

Career
Anstiss played for Hammersmith Athletic, before joining Brentford, Millwall, Watford, Rochdale and Sheffield Wednesday, before joining Port Vale in February 1927, along with 'a substantial financial consideration' in exchange for Alfred Strange. Strange went on to become an England international, but Anstiss did not head in the same direction. He had a great start to his Vale career though, scoring on his debut at The Old Recreation Ground in a 6–2 win over Notts County on 26 February. He went on to score a hat-trick in a 7–1 home win over Fulham on 2 April, and claimed 11 goals in 15 Second Division games in the 1926–27 campaign. This was the end of his purple patch, as he scored five goals in 32 games in the 1927–28 season. Injury brought him down in November 1928, and limited him to three goals in 17 matches in the 1928–29 relegation season. He scored 15 goals in 37 appearances in the 1929–30 season, as the "Valiants" were crowned champions of the Third Division North. He fell from favour in October 1930 and was limited to six goals in 17 games in the 1930–31 season. He was transferred to Swansea Town in May 1931. Later he played for Crewe Alexandra, Gillingham, Tunbridge Wells Rangers and Cray Wanderers.

Personal life 
Anstiss served as a Boy 1st Class in the Royal Navy during the First World War. Aged just 16, he saw action at the Battle of Jutland in 1916 and served on HMS Royal Oak. He joined the crew of the HMS Powerful the following year.

Career statistics

Honours
Port Vale
Football League Third Division North: 1929–30

References

Footballers from Hampstead
English footballers
Association football forwards
Royal Navy personnel of World War I
Brentford F.C. players
Millwall F.C. players
Watford F.C. players
Rochdale A.F.C. players
Sheffield Wednesday F.C. players
Port Vale F.C. players
Swansea City A.F.C. players
Crewe Alexandra F.C. players
Gillingham F.C. players
Tunbridge Wells F.C. players
Cray Wanderers F.C. players
English Football League players
1899 births
1964 deaths